Mahmudoba may refer to:
Mahmudoba, Khachmaz, Azerbaijan
Mahmudoba, Shahbuz, Azerbaijan